The Security Battalions (derisively known as Germanotsoliades (Γερμανοτσολιάδες) or Tagmatasfalites (Ταγματασφαλίτες)) were Greek collaborationist military groups, formed during the Axis occupation of Greece during World War II in order to support the German occupation troops.

History 

The Battalions were founded in 1943 by the government of Ioannis Rallis. The Rallis cabinet passed the law raising the Security Battalions on 7 April 1943. The driving force behind raising the Security Battalions was the former dictator, General Theodoros Pangalos, who saw the Security Battalions as his means of making a political comeback, and most of the Hellenic Army officers recruited into the Security Battalions in April 1943 were republicans who were in some way associated with Pangalos. The National Schism between royalists and republicans was still going strong in the 1940s, and there were considerable tensions between royalist politicians such as Rallis and republicans like Pangalos. Pangalos was a Greek nationalist who resented Greece's semi-colonial relationship with the United Kingdom before the Second World War, and he presented the return of the king as return to subordination to Britain.  However, both Rallis and Pangalos were men of the right who were strongly opposed to the National Liberation Front (EAM), which provided some grounds for unity.  Pangalos and the clique of the republican officers associated with him made it clear that the Security Battalions were meant to fight just as much against the return of King George II as they were against EAM, and initially royalist officers were reluctant to join. Both the Italians and the Germans distrusted the Security Battalions and provided them with only small arms, fearing that Pangalos, a tough, able soldier and a megalomaniac who was widely considered to be "half mad", was not a reliable partner. Though Pangalos did not formally have a position in the Security Battalions, he ensured his followers were given key command positions.

They were supported by the extreme right and Nazi sympathisers, but also by some centrist politicians who were concerned about the dominance of ELAS (the military arm of the communist-dominated National Liberation Front EAM) as the main body of the Greek resistance. Among the members of the Security Battalions one could find ex-army officers, forcefully conscripted soldiers, conservatives, landowners, extreme-right radicals and social outcasts, as well as opportunists who believed the Axis would win the war. The core of the Battalions consisted of men of the Royal Guard (Evzones, so the name tsoliádes).

The Security Battalions were initially a small force, and only began to grow when Italy signed an armistice with the Allies in September 1943. After the armistice, German forces seized the parts of Greece that been occupied by the Italians. In the confusion caused by the armistice, ELAS had taken the opportunity to take over many of the Italian armories in Greece, and started to use the vast haul of Italian weapons they had seized against the Germans. With ELAS better armed and the Germans now occupying more of Greece, the Higher SS Police Chief of Greece, Walter Schimana, argued that the Reich needed an auxiliary force to relieve the burden. After armistice of September 1943, the Germans became more generous in arming the Security Battalions. The growth in ELAS, which was now far better armed than it before the armistice, alarmed many conservative Greek officers, including the royalists, who started to join the Security Battalions as a way of defending the "bourgeois world". Despite their distaste for republicans like Pangalos, for many royalist officers the defense of the prewar status quo against EAM, came to override even the National Schism. One provincial governor, that of the Patras district, told an audience of Wehrmacht officers in February 1944: "Hellenism is by heritage and tradition opposed to the communist world-view. Annihilate communism!" For this reason, the governor announced that he was now recruiting for the Security Battalions in his district, saying he preferred that Greece be occupied by Germany permanently rather than see EAM come to power. The German military governor of the Balkans, General Alexander Löhr, in a message to Berlin stated his policy was to ensure "that the anti-communist part of the Greek population be fully utilised, revealing itself openly and obliged to display an undisguised hostility towards the communist side".

The main role of the Security Battalions was to fight against ELAS. Their aggregate force was at most 22,000 men, divided into 9 'evzonic' and 22 'voluntary' battalions, under the command of SS Lieutenant-General Walter Schimana. Although the plan was to expand them all over the occupied Greek territories, their main theater of action was in eastern Central Greece and Peloponnese. At that time, ELAS had already gained control over 1/3 of continental Greece. They remained faithful to the Germans even when the occupation was crumbling. Their last mission was to engage in combat against ELAS and keep them away from the main routes, in order to secure the safe exit of the German troops from Greece.

What the Greek people hated about the Battalions, even more than their collaborationist nature, was the total lack of control over their members.  For example, after a battle in the hamlet of Attali in Evvia the collaborationists pillaged the houses of the village, taking away 1,000 oka of oil, five sewing machines, 200 ok of cheese and 30 complete trousseaus.  60 mules were needed to carry away the loot.  By the end of the occupation their name was synonymous with arbitrary violence and frightful cruelty. The men of the Security Battalions were poorly disciplined and were much given to looting and rape. Even collaborationist officials of the Hellenic State complained that the Security Battalions were more of force for disorder than order as stole whatever they wanted, raped any women they wanted and killed whoever they pleased. The Security Battalions killed indiscriminately as it was German policy to cow the population of Greece into total submission by encouraging the Security Battalions to kill at random. Most of the people killed by the Security Battalions were not andartes or even associated with the andartes; instead being just killed at random as to instill such an atmosphere of fear in Greece that people would not want the andartes to operate in their area as that would bring the Security Battalions into their area. The mountainous terrain of Greece which favored the andartes together with the fact that the Wehrmacht was by 1944 fully committed elsewhere in Europe led to the policy of "total terror" being employed. Sometimes, the Security Battalions did engaged in targeted killings, as one Security Battalion death squad in Volos killed 50 local EAM members over the course of March 1944. More typical was the executions in the same month of 100 people shot at random as retaliation for the assassination by ELAS of General Franz Krech. When members of the Security Battalions were assassinated by ELAS, the Security Battalions tended to lash out by massacring any Greeks who just happened to be in the vicinity. The andartes would usually spare captured policemen or gendarmes unless they had been involved in killing fellow Greeks, but members of the Security Battalions, if captured were always summarily executed under the grounds that any member of the Security Battalions was a war criminal.

During the war, the Allied-oriented government in exile and the main resistance organizations in Greece decried the Security Battalions for treason multiple times. In November 1943, a British officer, Major Donald Stott, arrived in Athens and contacted the local branch of the Geheime Feldpolizei (German military police). During the course of Stott's extended visit with the GFP, he asked to arrange for the Security Battalions to switch over to serving the Cairo government when it returned to Greece as Stott asserted to his German hosts that his government did not want EAM to come to power under any conditions. Stott's visit was considered so important by the Germans that he met with Hermann Neubacher of the Auswärtiges Amt, who played a key role in governing the Balkans. Accordingly, to Neubacher's account of the meeting, Stott told him: "This war should end in the common struggle by the Allies and German forces against Bolshevism". Neubacher's account also stated that Stott apologised for Britain supplying EAM with arms, and that he believed "communist infiltration is already a serious threat in the Mediterranean". Stott was not arrested by the Germans and allowed to leave Athens for Cairo with the message that Germany wanted to work with Britain. In the last stages of World War II, many Nazi leaders such as the Reichsführer SS Heinrich Himmler believed that the alliance of Britain and the Soviet Union would not last, and inevitably the British would have to ally with the Reich against the Soviet Union. Broadly speaking, there were two tendencies on the German side in the last years of the war. Some of the Nazi leaders like Himmler, who influenced by his intelligence chief Walter Schellenberg tried to engage in various stratagems to break up the "Grand Alliance" such as his offer in 1944 to stop deporting Hungarian Jews to Auschwitz if the United States were to give Germany 50, 000 trucks that would only be used to supply the Wehrmacht on the Eastern Front. And the other side was the tendency strongly encouraged by Hitler himself that if Germany could not win the war, then all of Europe should be destroyed so that Allies would liberate a wasteland.

Given these hopes by some of the German side about the break-up of the "Big Three" alliance,  Walter Schimana, the Higher SS Police Chief for Greece, and the diplomat Hermann Neubacher welcomed Stott's mission as the beginning of an anti-Soviet Anglo-German alliance. The Geheime Feldpolizei in Balkans were led by Roman Loos, a career policeman from Austria who was described by the British historian Mark Mazower as a "wily" and "shadowy" figure who closely worked with the SS, and was never tried for war crimes. Loos became a prominent policeman in Austria after 1945, and at the time his retirement in 1962 was serving as the Austrian liaison officer for Interpol. Stott was in radio contact with the SOE headquarters in Cairo during his time as a guest of the Geheime Feldpolizei, reporting to Brigadier Keble. After Stott's meeting was exposed, he was disallowed as a "rogue" agent and reprimanded while Keble was fired. Stott's visit inflamed the suspicions of EAM of the Cairo government, as many EAM members believed the king after his return to Greece would pardon all of the Security Battalions, and enlist them to fight on his behalf. Mazower reported that many of the documents relating to the Stott mission at the Public Record Office are still closed to historians. Mazower argued on the basis of one declassified document stating "our long term policy towards Greece is to retain her in the British sphere of influence, and...a Russian-dominated Greece would not be in accordance with British strategy in the Eastern Mediterranean" that the British were willing to push the Cairo government to ally with any anti-communist force in Greece.

The belief that the British supported the Security Battalions and that the king would pardon all of the men who served in them further encouraged royalist officers to join. In a speech to mark Hitler's birthday on 20 April 1944 before the officers of the Security Battalions, Schimana announced that the most dividing line in the world was between communism vs. anticommunism, and predicted that the "Grand Alliance" against Germany would soon fell apart. Schimana predicted that both the United Kingdom and the United States would soon realize that the alliance with the Soviet Union was not in their best interests, and that the Anglo-Americans would switch sides to ally themselves with Germany. Referring to the Stott mission, Schimana argued to his audience that Britain approved of the Security Battalions and it only just a matter of time before British, Greek and German soldiers would be all fighting side by side against the Soviet Union and those loyal to the Soviet Union. One of the Security Battalions' royalist officers, Major-General Vasilos Dertilis, in a recruiting speech in May 1944 to a group of his fellow royalists stated that the denunciations of the Security Battalions by the radio station of the Cairo government were just for "show", and that in fact both the British and the king secretly supported the Security Battalions. In May 1944, a secret emissary representing Dertilis arrived in Cairo with a message for the government-in-exile that the Security Battalions were a "patriotic organisation" committed to the "national struggle" against communism, and that when Greece was liberated, they would reveal their true loyalty was to the king.

The idea of a "Greek bridge" in the form of the Security Battalions that would lead to an Anglo-American-German alliance against the Soviet Union was vigorously opposed by SS-Standartenführer Walter Blume who still believed that Germany on its own would defeat the "Big Three" alliance of the Soviet Union, the United States and the United Kingdom. Blume saw Britain as much an enemy as the Soviet Union, and he was much closer to republican officers like Pangalos than to royalist officers like Dertilis. Blume used his influence to try promote republican officers over royalist officers in the Security Battalions, and after Dertilis gave his speech in May 1944 boasting about his contacts with the Cairo government, he ordered his arrest under the grounds that Dertilis was a British spy  Dertilis was sent to Vienna to be interrogated by the Gestapo while Blume had the Athens headquarters of the Security Battalions searched for evidence of contacts with Britain and the Cairo government. Rallis was furious at Blume's action and asked Schimana to dismiss him. Blume, who had a fearsome reputation as the most extreme and violent of all the SS leaders in Greece was greatly feared by his other SS officers, including his superior, the Higher SS Police Chief Schimana, and no action was taken against him.

The idea that the Security Battalions were secretly supported by the United Kingdom and the United States encouraged them to commit atrocities as they believed that would not be punished after the war. EAM reported that many of the men serving in the Security Battalions were claiming that "they are serving the interests of England with her consent". After raiding the village of Pili in July 1944 looking for EAM members, the local Security Battalion told the villagers: "Next time we will come back with the English" One agent of the American Office of Strategic Services (OSS) reported after interviewing captured members of the Security Battalions that 35-40% of them believed that the governments of Britain and the United States secretly approved of them fighting for Germany. A member of the Security Battalions wrote in 1944: "Our leaders gave us lectures and tell us that we are chasing the Andartes of EAM/ELAS and that way we are going to avoid Communism; and that the leaders of the Security Battalions act after the orders of the King with whom they are in contact". Many of the leaders of the Cairo government secretly approved of the Security Battalions as a counterweight to EAM. In June 1944 the Greek government-in-exile asked that the BBC's Greek language service stop denouncing the Security Battalions as traitors under the grounds that these men were going to be useful to the government after the war, a request the British government granted. At the same time, the Cairo government also asked that the British and American air forces stop dropping propaganda leaflets over Greece warning that all of the Security Battalions were going to be tried for treason and war crimes after the liberation, as this discouraged recruitment by the Security Battalions whom the government was planning to use to fight against EAM once it returned to Greece.

In the summer of 1944, the Security Battalions assisted German forces in Athens with the bloko (round-ups). In the blokos, an entire district of Athens, usually one of the poor neighborhoods where EAM was most popular, was sealed off while the occupying forces and the Security Battalions rounded up the entire male population of the district. Informers wearing hoods to hide their identities would point out suspected EAM members, who were shot on the spot. Other men who merely suspected of being sympathetic towards EAM would be taken to Haidhari prison, where they were held as hostages, with the German policy being that these men would be executed if there any more ELAS attacks against them. The bloko was ordered by Blume as part of his strategy of polarization as he wanted to provoke more violence to justify even more extreme violence on his part. Blume had decided that Rallis was insufficient pliant, and was intriguing to replace him with Pangalos. From Blume's viewpoint, having Athens reduced to chaos would show the need to sack Rallis, who was close to a nervous breakdown in the summer of 1944, and replacing him with the stronger Pangalos. Ultimately, Blume was planning to carry out the "Chaos Thesis" under which the Germans before withdrawing from Greece would destroy all of the infrastructure such as factories, railroads, ports, etc., and furthermore would execute the entire political Greek leadership to reduce the country to complete chaos. Appointing Pangalos as prime minister and letting the Security Battalions run amok were part of Blume's preparations for the executing the "Chaos Thesis".

On the eve of the liberation, several battles took place between the Battalions and ELAS; the best known being the Battle of Meligalas in September 1944. After the liberation, the groups were only temporarily disbanded, and were recruited into the Gendarmerie to fight alongside the British and government forces against the EAM/ELAS in the battle of Dekemvriana, in Athens. The Security Battalions always surrendered to the British, who usually let them keep the weapons the Germans had supplied with. General Ronald Scobie who commanded the British forces in Greece, in contrast to his attitude towards EAM, whom he dismissed as mere "bandits", treated the Security Battalions as a legitimate military force. The British Prime Minister Winston Churchill had a very favorable view of the Security Battalions, saying "It seems to me that the collaborators in Greece in many cases did the best they could to shelter the Greek population from German oppression". When he criticized by Labour MPs in the House of Commons for employing the Security Battalions to fight on the British side against EAM in the Dekemvriana, Churchill replied: "The Security Battalions came into existence to protect the Greek villagers from the depredations of some of those who, under the guise of being saviours of their country, were living upon the inhabitants and doing very little fighting against the Germans". In total, very few of their members were tried and convicted of collaborationism. For instance, their creator and quisling Prime Minister of Greece, Rallis, was sentenced to life imprisonment for treason and died in prison in 1946, but he was acquitted for his involvement with the Security Battalions.

After the defeat of the EAM in Dekemvriana, the members continued to hunt down left, communist and anti-royalist civilians during the white terror period that ensued after the Varkiza Agreement that dismantled ELAS. Many ex-members continued carrying out atrocities against the DSE during the Greek Civil War. During the Civil War, Security Battalions veteran officers organized themselves in a secret group known as the Holy Bond of Greek Officers, which from 1947 onward was subsidized by the Central Intelligence Agency as one of Greece's principle "democratic" (i.e. anti-communist) groups. After the Civil War, and during the persecution of the communists during the 1950s and '60s in Greece, many of the brutal military personnel of the exile islands accused of tortures were ex-members of the security Battalions.  Finally, the leader of the Greek junta of the 1970s, Georgios Papadopoulos had also been accused of being a member of the Security Battalions, but without definite proof. One of the first acts of Papadopoulos's government after the 1967 coup d'état was to change the pension rules to declare that Security Battalion veterans could collect pensions for their services, and that those who had served and were serving in the Greek military could "top up" their pensions by presenting proof to the pension board of their service in the Security Battalions in 1943–44. After the 1967 coup d'état, in a speech on the floor of the U.S. Senate, Senator Lee Metcalf called the new government "a military regime of collaborators and Nazi sympathizers who are receiving American aid". In another speech before the Senate on 16 November 1971, Metcalf listed the members of the Greek junta who had served in the Security Battalions and denounced the administration of Richard Nixon for supporting what he called a "junta of Nazi collaborators".

Some members of the Security Battalions were recognized during the Greek military junta of 1967-74 by law as "resistance fighters against the Axis", but this decision was cancelled after the fall of the regime.

Oath
Recruits to the Security battalion swore under the following oath:

Members

Xenophon Giosmas, after years he took part in the conspiracy for the assassination of Grigoris Lambrakis
Dionysios Papadongonas, was killed later during the Dekemvriana
Georgios Poulos

References

Sources

External links

Axis History Forum.com: The Greek Volunteer Battalions

Fascism in Greece
Axis occupation of Greece
Government paramilitary forces
Paramilitary organizations based in Greece
Military history of Greece during World War II
Military units and formations established in 1943
Military units and formations disestablished in 1944
1943 establishments in Greece
1944 disestablishments in Greece
Anti-communism in Greece
Collaboration with Nazi Germany‎
Anti-communist organizations